A blacksmith is an artisan specializing in the hand-wrought manufacture of ferrous (iron) metal objects.

Blacksmith may also refer to:

Places
 Blacksmith Creek, a river in Kansas, United States
 Blacksmith Run, a stream in Pennsylvania
 Blacksmiths, New South Wales, a suburb of Lake Macquarie in New South Wales, Australia

Groups
 Blacksmith Institute
 Blacksmith Records, a record label founded by New York rapper Talib Kweli
 Worshipful Company of Blacksmiths, one of the Livery Companies of the City of London, England

Music
 Blacksmith (musical group), a British record production and remixing trio
 Black Smith (album), a 1974 album by Jimmy Smith
 "Blacksmith" (song), an English folk song

Film
 Blacksmith Scene, an 1893 Kinetoscope film shot in Thomas Edison's Black Maria studio
 Les Forgerons or The Blacksmiths, an 1895 French film directed by Louis Lumière
 The Blacksmith, a 1922 film starring Buster Keaton
 The Blacksmith (1944 film), 1944 Mexican film

Other
 Blacksmith (comics), a DC Comics character and villain of the Flash
 Black' Smith, a South Korean restaurant chain
 Blacksmith (fish), a fish native to the eastern Pacific Ocean
 Blacksmith (truck), a monster truck that used to run on the Monster Jam circuit
 Henkka Seppälä (born 1980), a Finnish bassist nicknamed "Blacksmith"